Alice Murphy is a former Papua New Guinea international lawn bowler.

Bowls career
In 1969 she won the triples bronze medal at the 1969 World Outdoor Bowls Championship in Sydney, Australia.

References

Living people
Papua New Guinean female bowls players
Year of birth missing (living people)